Paolo Consorti (San Benedetto del Tronto, Italy, 1964) is an Italian artist and film director.

Biography

Paolo Consorti attended the Academy of Fine Arts in Macerata, and while there, he participated in some cinematographic collaborations with Sergei Bondarchuk. In 1991, he debuted his first solo exposition at the Palazzo Ducale di Urbino. In 1992, the philosopher Hans-Georg Gadamer made a comparison between Consorti and Hieronymus Bosch on the base of their shared "contrast between pictorial and dramatic balance of modern and post-modern". In 1994, the art critic Pierre Restany called Consorti's work the "emergence of a sublime post-modern style".
In 1996, he participated in the XII Quadrennial National Art exhibit at the Palazzo delle Esposizioni in Rome.

In 2003, he took part in the First Prague Biennial at the Veletrzni Palac in Prague, and the next year he participated in the XIV Quadrennial National Art exhibit at the Palazzo della Promotrice in Turin and was included in the Zanichelli Art encyclopedia.
In 2006, Consorti took part in "Garten Eden – Der Garten in der Kunst seit 1900" in Emden, Germany, and was one of the Italian artists chosen to represent Italy in the nature and metamorphosis expositions at the Urban Planning Exhibition Center in Shanghai and the Millennium Art Museum in Beijing. In 2008, he showed his work at the World Olympic Fine Arts Museum in Beijing and was invited to the Moscow Biennial for Young Art at the Ruarts Foundation of Moscow. Also in 2008, he was picked for the Farnesiana Young Collection at the Italian Ministry of Foreign Affairs, exhibiting the works of young Italian artists most representative of the national scene, and he was included in the young Italian art Top 100 published by Flash Art. In 2009, Consorti created a large fresco of the nativity, electronically projected on a public square in Assisi. In 2010, he created some music videos for the Italian edition of the TV show X Factor.

In 2011, he took part in the 54th Venice Biennal at the Italian Pavilion, where he presented the first performance in his Rebellio Patroni series. This was a work in progress that was composed of different performances in which the patron saints of Italian cities acted with paradoxical actions in the present time. The act included the participation of Elio, from the band Elio e le Storie Tese, who played the part of Francis of Assisi. He followed this by a performance at the Madre Museum in Naples, with actor Giobbe Covatta playing San Gennaro. He has also done solo expositions in Melbourne, Berlin, Amsterdam, Minneapolis, Hamburg, New York, Marshall and Tokyo. In June 2012 he will bring "Rebellio patroni" with a great solo show with Paintings, installations, video and performance at Palazzo Reale of Milan.

Films and art videos
2007 - Dentro le segrete cose, art video
2008 - Sapore aspro d'amore, art video
2010 - Free tomorrow, art video
2012 - Rebellio patroni, docufilm
2013 - Il sole dei cattivi, film
2014 -   Figli di Maam, film
2019 -   Havana Kyrie, film
2021 - Anime borboniche, film

Publications
Gianluca Marziani, Paolo Consorti, Castelvecchi Arte, Rome, 1999
Gianluca Marziani, Melting Pop, Castelvecchi Arte, Rome, 2001
Luca Beatrice, Dizionario della Giovane Arte Italiana, Giancarlo Politi Editore, Milan, 2003
Giancarlo Politi, Helena Kontova, Prague Biennale 1: Peripheries become the Center, Giancarlo Politi Editore, Milan, 2003
Gianluca Marziani, Melting Pop, Palazzo delle Papesse, Siena, Silvana Editoriale, Cinisiello Balsamo, Milan, 2003
Edigeo, Enciclopedia dell’Arte Zanichelli, Zanichelli, Bologna, 2004
Marisa Vescovo, Natura e metamorfosi, Urban Planning Exhibition Center, Shanghai –  Millenium Art Museum, Beijing, Damiani, Bologna, 2006
VV.AA., Europäischer monat der fotografie Berlin, Kulturprojekte, Berlin, 2006
VV.AA., Collezione Farnesina – Experimenta, Ministero Affari Esteri, Gangemi Editore, Rome, 2008
VV.AA., In Opera, sulle orme di Matteo Ricci, Palazzo Buonaccorsi, Edizioni Artemisia, 2010
Vittorio Sgarbi, L’Arte non è cosa nostra: The Italian Pavilion at the 54th International Art Exhibition of the Venice Biennale, Skira, Milan, 2011
Antonio Arévalo, Rebellio Patroni, Sant'Ambrogio e il piccolo Duomo, Palazzo Reale Milan, Silvana Editoriale 2012
Premio Marche, Biennale d'Arte contemporanea, Edizioni Artemisia, 2018
Premio Vasto, Opere dalla collezione, Edizioni Martintype, 2020

Awards and nominations
 Terni Film Festival 2014, Best Movie for Il sole dei cattivi
 Roma Festival Internazionale Cinema Patologico 2015, Special mention for "Il sole dei cattivi"
 Sofia International Film Festival 2016, Special mention for "Figli di Maam"
 Social World Film Festival 2016, Special Mention for "Figli di Maam"
 Chicago Indie Film Awards 2020, Best Movie for Havana Kyrie
 Short Long World Festival Argentina 2020, Best Movie for Havana Kyrie
 Global Indian Film Festival 2020, Best Movie for "Havana Kyrie"
 Festival Internazionale Cinema Salerno 2020, Best Movie abroad for "Havana Kyrie"
 Croffi Film Festival 2020, Special mention for "Havana Kyrie"
 Montreal Independent Film Festival 2020, Special mention for "Havana Kyrie"
 Monaco New Wave Film Festival 2020, Special Mention for "Havana Kyrie"

References

External links
Art News Rai
TV Report Domenica In Rai Uno, XFactor RaiDue
Tv Report TgR
Tv Report Striscia la Notizia
Tv Report Uno Mattina Raiuno

1964 births
Living people
Italian contemporary artists